The Panineeya Institute of Dental Sciences & Research Centre, Hyderabad was established in Hyderabad in 2003. It offers graduate and post-graduate courses in dental surgery. Its programmes were approved by the Indian Ministry of Health and Family Welfare, the Dental Council of India, and the Government of Andhra Pradesh. The college has an intake of 100 seats per year in BDS and MDS (70 merit and 30 management).

Footnotes

External links
Official website

Dental colleges in India
Universities and colleges in Hyderabad, India
2003 establishments in Andhra Pradesh
Educational institutions established in 2003